Markus Foser (born 31 January 1968) is a Liechtensteiner former alpine skier who competed in the 1992 Winter Olympics and 1994 Winter Olympics.

Foser is most notable for his sole win on the Alpine skiing World Cup, achieved in the Val Gardena downhill in December 1993 from a bib number of 66 in changing conditions. This was the first World Cup downhill win for a male skier from Liechtenstein. He scored two more top ten finishes on the World Cup, both in downhill - a seventh place in Aspen, Colorado in March 1994 and a fourth in the 1995 edition of the Val Gardena downhill.

References

External links
 sports-reference.com

1968 births
Living people
Liechtenstein male alpine skiers
Olympic alpine skiers of Liechtenstein
Alpine skiers at the 1992 Winter Olympics
Alpine skiers at the 1994 Winter Olympics